Eublemma acarodes is a species of moth of the family Erebidae first described by Charles Swinhoe in 1907. It is found in Angola, Madagascar, Tanzania and Zimbabwe.

References

Boletobiinae
Lepidoptera of Angola
Lepidoptera of Tanzania
Lepidoptera of Zimbabwe
Moths of Madagascar
Moths of Sub-Saharan Africa
Moths described in 1907